Franco (Francesco) Serantini (July 16, 1951 – May 7, 1972) was an Italian anarchist.

Biography 
He was born in Cagliari and spent his childhood in a foster family and in institutions, sometimes under a semi-free regime. After graduating from the Fibonacci state school, he started developing leftist political ideas.and eventually ended in the Pisa-based anarchist group "Giuseppe Pinelli". He was active in various initiatives of the anarchist and anti-fascist movement. On May 5, 1972, he took part in an anti-fascist demonstration which was attacked by the police and, among others, he was heavily beaten and arrested. During his interrogation he showed signs of unease which the police officers along with the judges and doctors did not consider serious. On May 7, he was found in a state of coma in his cell and a little later he died in the prison's emergency room.

References

External links 

1951 births
1972 deaths
Deaths related to the Years of Lead (Italy)
History of Pisa
Italian anarchists
Italian people who died in prison custody
People from Cagliari
Prisoners who died in Italian detention
1972 murders in Italy

Murdered anarchists